Stráž nad Nisou (until 1947 Starý Habendorf) is a municipality and village in Liberec District in the Liberec Region of the Czech Republic. It has about 2,400 inhabitants.

Administrative parts
The village of Svárov is an administrative part of Stráž nad Nisou.

History
The first written mention of Stráž nad Nisou is from 1469.

References

External links

Villages in Liberec District